The Missouri Library Association (MLA) is a professional organization for Missouri's librarians and library workers. It is headquartered in Ballwin, Missouri. It was founded on December 18, 1900, in Columbia, Missouri, at a meeting called by Fredrick Crunden, Head Librarian for the St. Louis Public Library; Carrie Whitney, Director of the Kansas City Public Library; Charles Yeater, Trustee and President of the Board of Directors for the Sedalia Public Library; Purd Wright, Librarian at the St. Joseph Public Library; and James Gerould, University Librarian at the University of Missouri. The organization's first president was Fredrick Crunden.

One of the organizations early goals was the establishment of a state library which was accomplished in 1907. MLA worked to create a librarian certification program, forming a Certification Board in 1934.

References

External links
 Missouri Library Association website

Library associations in the United States
Organizations based in Missouri
Organizations based in Columbia, Missouri